Iris (minor planet designation: 7 Iris) is a large main-belt asteroid and possible remnant planetesimal orbiting the Sun between Mars and Jupiter. It is the fourth-brightest object in the asteroid belt. It is classified as an S-type asteroid, meaning that it has a stony composition.

Discovery and name
Iris was discovered on August 13, 1847, by J. R. Hind from London, UK. It was Hind's first asteroid discovery and the seventh asteroid to be discovered overall.

Iris was named after the rainbow goddess Iris in Greek mythology, who was a messenger to the gods, especially Hera. Her quality of attendant of Hera was particularly appropriate to the circumstances of discovery, as Iris was spotted following 3 Juno by less than an hour of right ascension (Juno is the Roman equivalent of Hera).

Iris's original symbol was a rainbow and a star:  or more simply .

Characteristics

Geology
Iris is an S-type asteroid. The surface is bright and is probably a mixture nickel-iron metals and magnesium- and iron-silicates. Its spectrum is similar to that of L and LL chondrites with corrections for space weathering, so it may be an important  contributor of these meteorites. Planetary dynamics also indicates that it should be a significant source of meteorites.

Among the S-type asteroids, Iris ranks fifth in geometric mean diameter after Eunomia, Juno, Amphitrite and Herculina. Its shape is consistent with an oblate spheroid with a large equatorial excavation, suggesting it is a remnant planetesimal. No collisional family can be associated with Iris, likely because the excavating impact occurred early in the history of the Solar System, and the debris has since dispersed.

Brightness

Iris's bright surface and small distance from the Sun make it the fourth-brightest object in the asteroid belt after Vesta, Ceres, and Pallas.  It has a mean opposition magnitude of +7.8, comparable to that of Neptune, and can easily be seen with binoculars at most oppositions. At typical oppositions it marginally outshines the larger though darker Pallas. But at rare oppositions near perihelion Iris can reach a magnitude of +6.7 (last time on October 31, 2017, reaching a magnitude of +6.9), which is as bright as Ceres ever gets.

Surface features
A study by Hanus et al. using data from the VLT's SPHERE instrument names eight craters 20 to 40 km in diameter, and seven recurring features of unknown nature that remain nameless due to a lack of consistency and their occurrence on the edge of Iris. The names are Greek names of colors, corresponding to the rainbow as the sign of Iris. It is unknown whether these names are under consideration by the IAU. The other 7 features are labeled A through G.

Rotation
Iris has a rotational period of 7.14 hours. Iris's north pole points towards the ecliptic coordinates (λ, β) estimated to be (18°, +19°) with a 4° uncertainty (Viikinkoski et al. 2017) or (19°, +26°) with a 3° uncertainty (Hanuš et al. 2019). This gives an axial tilt of xx°, so that on much of each hemisphere, the sun does not set during summer, and does not rise during winter. On an airless body this gives rise to very large temperature differences.

Observations

Iris was observed occulting a star on May 26, 1995, and later on July 25, 1997. Both observations gave a diameter of about 200 km.

See also
 Former classification of planets

Notes

References

External links
Shape model deduced from lightcurve (M. Kaasalainen 2002)
 2011-Feb-19 Occultation (Durech Model) / (2011 Asteroidal Occultation Results for North America)
"Discovery of Iris", MNRAS 7 (1847) 299
 JPL Ephemeris
 (displays Elong from Sun and V mag for 2011)
 
 

Background asteroids
Iris
Iris
S-type asteroids (Tholen)
S-type asteroids (SMASS)
18470813